Barilius shacra is a fish in genus Barilius of the family Cyprinidae.

Biology
The Barilius shacra is not recorded to be in any threat to become an endangered species and is considered to be the least concern.

Size
The average length of Barilius shacra is about  100 – 130 mm.

Feeding
The Barilius shacra is considered to be a surface-feeder who preys on insects that fly and other small fishes and benthic invertebrates. When this species is kept in an aquarium, they are not picky about what they eat and will accept most food given to them.

Location
The Barilius shacra is found in the following freshwater areas:
Kosi/Koshi River
Ganges River
Himalayas 
Nepal 
Padma River
Bangladesh

References 

shacra
Fish described in 1822